Indotyphlops pammeces, the South India worm snake, is a harmless blind snake species found in southern India. No subspecies are currently recognized.

Geographic range
Found in southern India. The type locality given is "Madras" [India].

References

Further reading

 Annandale N. 1906. Notes on the fauna of a desert tract in southern India. Part. I. Batrachians and reptiles, with remarks on the reptiles of the desert region of the North-West Frontier. Mem Asiatic Soc Bengal Calcutta 1: 183-202.
 Günther A. 1864. The Reptiles of British India. London (Taylor & Francis), xxvii + 452 pp.

External links
 

Indotyphlops
Reptiles described in 1864
Taxa named by Albert Günther